Lea Ypi (born 8 September 1979) is an Albanian author and academic. She is a professor of political theory at the London School of Economics. She was recently named by the British magazine Prospect one of the world's top ten thinkers and by the Frankfurter Allgemeine Zeitung as one of the most important culture personalities of 2022. Her work has been translated in 27 languages. She is a member of the jury of the Deutscher Memorial Prize.

Personal life
Ypi was born in Tirana, the eldest child of Xhaferr Ypi and Vjollca Veli who were relatively regular citizens under communist rule, but who later became involved in Albanian democratic politics in Ypi's late childhood prior to the Albanian civil war in 1997. She grew up in both communist and post-communist Albania, the experience of this transition being the main topic of her book 'Free: Coming of Age at the End of History' (2021). Though her family were compelled to be atheist under communist rule, her family was historically Muslim. Ypi herself says she is now agnostic. One of her paternal great-grandfathers, Xhafer Ypi, was briefly Prime Minister of Albania in the 1920s, and also very briefly headed the Albanian government following the Italian occupation.

Education

Ypi earned her laurea in philosophy at the Sapienza University of Rome in 2002 and her laurea in Literature from the same institution in 2004. She received her Master of Research  from the European University Institute in 2005 and her PhD from the European University Institute in 2008. Prior to joining the LSE she was a post-doctoral prize research fellow at Nuffield College, Oxford.

In addition to her native Albanian, Ypi is fluent in English, Italian, French and she also speaks German and Spanish.

Works 
Ypi's research interests are in normative political theory (including democratic theory, theories of justice, and issues of migration and territorial rights), Enlightenment political thought (especially Kant), Marxism and critical theory, as well as the intellectual history of the Balkans, especially her native Albania.

Her book Free: Coming of Age at the End of History was shortlisted for the Baillie Gifford Prize for Nonfiction, and the Costa Prize for Biography. It won the Ondaatje Prize   the Slightly Foxed First Biography Prize, and was The Sunday Times memoir of the year and a book of the year for The Guardian, The New Yorker, The Financial Times, the TLS, The Spectator, New Statesman, Washington Post, Foreign Affairs and the Daily Mail. In 2022, BBC Radio 4 serialised the book in their Book of the Week series.

Selected bibliography

 The Meaning of Partisanship (with Jonathan White), Oxford University Press, 2016.
 Global Justice and Avant-Garde Political Agency, Oxford University Press, 2012.
 Kant and Colonialism: Historical and Critical Perspectives (co-edited with Katrin Flikschuh), Oxford University Press, 2014.
 Migration in Political Theory: The Ethics of Movement and Membership (co-edited with Sarah Fine), Oxford University Press, 2016.
 Free: Coming of Age at the End of History, Penguin, 2021.
 The Architectonic of Reason: Purposiveness and Systematic Unity in Kant's Critique of Pure Reason, Oxford University Press, 2021.

References

External links
Lea Ypi page, LSE Department of Government
[Lea Ypi] personal webpage
Lea Ypi page, The Guardian
Interview , New Statesman
Interview , Publishers Weekly

1979 births
Living people
Academics of the London School of Economics
21st-century Albanian women
Albanian academics
Albanian philosophers
Albanian women philosophers
Sapienza University of Rome alumni
People from Tirana
21st-century Albanian women writers
Lea